Hierarchical Triangular Mesh (HTM) is a kind of quad tree used for mesh generation in 3-D computer graphics and geometric data structures.

Functions 

 It provides a systematic indexing method for objects localized on a sphere. 
 It is an efficient method for searching different resolutions like arc seconds or hemispheres.
 It can be used as a method to subdivide the spherical surface into triangles of nearly equal shape and size.

References 

Mesh generators
3D graphics software that uses Qt
Trees (data structures)
Geometric data structures